Clathrodrillia salvadorica is a species of sea snail, a marine gastropod mollusk in the family Drilliidae.

Description
The size of an adult shell varies between 20 mm and 30 mm.

Distribution
This marine species occurs between the Gulf of California and El Salvador.

References

External links
 

Salvadorica
Gastropods described in 1951